Athoor is a town in the Dindigul district of India between Dindigul and Bathalagundua about 3 km west of Sempatti. It is one of the legislative assemblies of Tamil Nadu. Rice cultivation is the major occupation.

Kamarajar Sagar Dam is situated in the west part of the town. The population is around 15,300. The Kodaganar River runs through the town, joining the Kaveri River. Athoor has a beautiful Catholic church which is about 50 years old.

Sadayandi Temple is situated in the hill caves. Every year during the month of Aadi, the temple hosts the Aadi Amavasai festival, which attracts thousands of people annually.

Places to visit 
Shri Kasi Vishwanathar temple, located in Athoor, is one of the oldest temples in the vicinity.  The Lingam constructed in this temple is similar to Kasi temple lingam. Those who are unable to visit Kasi can get the blessings of Lord Shiva from here. The temple is over 1000 years old, and many devotees in and around Athoor worship there. In December, the Karthikai Festival is celebrated in this temple.

Another temple in Athoor is the Shri Vandi Kali Amman temple. Once a year, a festival called 'thirevela' is celebrated here. Another festival happens in the month of October, just like Thiruvaiyaru Mahothsava. Many musicians gather here and worship the Lord in "Shri Rama Bajanai Sangam". This kind of worship has been followed for more than 100 years.

Another church in Athoor is the church of our lady of assumption. The church is built by Fr. Clement Montaud SJ. The village has a sizeable number of Catholics. Moreover, Fr. Clement Montaud SJ was known as someone who worked for all the religious people. He was popular with all the religious people. He was a known anthropologist of his times. He worked earlier in Usilampatti area of Madurai District. Most of the Catholics here own land here.

Kamarajar Dam at Kamarajar Lake is a 400-acre monsoon-fed water body 6 km West from Athoor village. This lake is a beautiful location with the hills of the Western Ghats overlooking it. Fishermen in their coracles on the lake and coconut and banana plantations and cardamom estates are the common sights on the surrounding hills.

Peaceful accommodations near to Dindigul: Some eco-friendly resorts are along the northern border of the Kamarajar Lake. This area allows tourists to experience India's beautiful ecology on its best. Coconut trees and mango trees are plenty in the area, making a tropical atmosphere prevalent here.

Taking long and leisurely walks through the countryside in the area is one of the most popular activities in this area. Several different walking trails are available for use around Kamarajar Lake. Most places worth seeing near Kamarajar can be walked to in a reasonable amount of time using these walking trails.

It is possible to experience some great bird watching while on your walk. Birds such as peacocks, storks, kingfishers, cranes, herons, and sunbirds are all known to frequent the area. In fact, one bird watching group from Great Britain was even able to document seeing 160 different species of birds in a short four-day span of time. Trekking is another popular tourist activity in the area. With so many beautiful and natural sites to see, no wonder people want to do more than just briefly experience the landscape.

Athoor is one of the Town in Athoor Taluk in Dindigul District in Tamil Nadu State . Athoor is 14.2 km far from its District Main City Dindigul . It is 403 km from its State Main City Chennai.

Nearest towns are Dindigul (12.1 km), Nilakottai (14.5 km), Reddiyarchatiram (17.9 km), Vattalkundu (18.5 km).

Akkaraipatti, Alamarathupatti, Athoor, Bodikamanvadi, Chettiapatti, Gandhigram, ... . are the villages along with this village in the same Athoor Taluk

Although tigers are not seen in this area, other types of wildlife do flourish in this region. It is possible to see leopards, barking deer, sambar, mongoose, monkeys, barking deer, wild boar throughout and rarely lories in the area. Kamarajar Dam and the surrounding hills of Kamrajar Lake are common places to visit.

Politics
Athoor assembly constituency is part of Dindigul (Lok Sabha constituency).

Notable residents

Shri Marimuthu Swamigal was credited with miracles and revered as a saint. His devotees perform Gurupooja every year in his honor.

References

Villages in Dindigul district

ta:ஆத்தூர்